The 2008 Grand Prix Hassan II was a men's tennis tournament played on outdoor clay courts. It was the 24th edition of the Grand Prix Hassan II, and was part of the International Series of the 2008 ATP Tour. It took place at the Complexe Al Amal in Casablanca, Morocco, from 18 May through 25 May 2008.

The main draw was led by Australian Open runner-up and Sydney doubles champion Jo-Wilfried Tsonga, 2007 Bucharest semifinalist Gaël Monfils, and Houston quarterfinalist Agustín Calleri. Other seeded players were Estoril quarterfinalist Marc Gicquel, Auckland semifinalist Julien Benneteau, Chris Guccione, Florent Serra and Victor Hănescu.

Finals

Singles

 Gilles Simon defeated  Julien Benneteau, 7–5, 6–2
It was Gilles Simon's 1st title of the year, and his 3rd overall.

Doubles

 Albert Montañés /  Santiago Ventura defeated  James Cerretani /  Todd Perry, 6–1, 6–2

External links
 Official website
 Singles draw
 Doubles draw
 Qualifying Singles draw